A Christian democratic party is a political party that seeks to apply Christian principles to public policy.

Christian Democratic Party or Christian Democrats may also refer to :

Active parties
African Christian Democratic Party, South Africa
Albanian Christian Democratic Party of Kosovo
Christian Democratic Party of Albania
Christian Democratic Party (Argentina)
Christian Democratic Party (Australia)
Christian Democratic Party (Bolivia)
Christian Democrat Party of Chile
Christian Democratic Party of Cuba
Christian Democrat Party (Democratic Republic of the Congo)
Christian Democrats (Denmark)
Christian Democratic Party (East Timor)
Christian Democratic Party (El Salvador)
Christian Democratic Party of Honduras
Christian Democracy (Italy, 2004)
Christian Democracy (Italy, 2012)
Christian Democratic Party (Italy)
Christian Democratic Party (Norway)
Christian Democratic Party (Papua New Guinea)
Christian Democratic Party (Paraguay)
Christian Democratic Party of Russia
Christian Democratic Party (Rwanda)
Christian Democratic Party of Serbia
Christian Democrats (Sweden)
Christian Democratic Party of Uruguay
Demochristian Party of Albania
Sammarinese Christian Democratic Party, San Marino

Historical parties
 Christian Democratic Party (Belize)
 Christian Democratic Party (Burundi)
 Croatian Christian Democratic Party, Croatia
 Christian Democratic Party (Czech Republic)
 Christian People's Party (Estonia)
 Christian Democracy (Italy), 1943
 Christian Democracy (Italy, 2002)
 Christian Democracy for the Autonomies, Italy
 Christian Democratic Party (Jamaica)
 Christian Democratic Party of Moldova
 Christian Democratic Party (Namibia)
 Christian Democratic Party (Netherlands)
 Christian Democratic Party (Samoa)
 Slovene Christian Democrats, Slovenia
 Christian Democratic Party (South Africa)
 Christian Democratic Party (Spain)

See also
List of Christian democratic parties
Christian Democratic Union (disambiguation)
Christian People's Party (disambiguation)
Christian Social Party (disambiguation)